Southern Kamchadal, also known as Southern Itelmen, is an extinct Kamchatkan language of Russia.

References

Chukotko-Kamchatkan languages
Extinct languages of Asia